Mikael Salomon (born 24 February 1945) is a Danish cinematographer, director and producer of film and television. After a long cinematography career in Danish cinema, he transitioned to the Hollywood film industry in the late 1980s earning two Academy Award nominations. He is also a television director whose credits include dozens of series, films and miniseries including Band of Brothers, Salem's Lot, Rome, and The Andromeda Strain. His awards and nominations include a Primetime Emmy Award and a Directors Guild of America Award.

Life and career 

Born in Copenhagen, Denmark, Salomon photographed dozens of films in his native country, earning awards including the Robert Award and Bodil Awards. In the late 1980s, he relocated to Hollywood and shot his first mainstream American film with Torch Song Trilogy, a 1988 comedy-drama starring Harvey Fierstein, Anne Bancroft, and Matthew Broderick. The following year, he shot the James Cameron-helmed science fiction film The Abyss, a film that helped to pioneer the field of computer-generated visual effects. Salomon used three cameras in watertight housings that were specially designed. Another special housing was designed for scenes that went from above-water dialogue to below-water dialogue. The filmmakers had to figure out how to keep the water clear enough to shoot and dark enough to look realistic at 2,000 feet (700 m), which was achieved by floating a thick layer of plastic beads in the water and covering the top of the tank with an enormous tarpaulin. His work on the film earned Salomon a nomination for an Academy Award for Best Cinematography.

In the following years, Salomon shot several blockbuster films like Always, Backdraft, and Far and Away, collaborating with directors like Steven Spielberg and Ron Howard.

In 1993, Salomon directed A Far Off Place, an adventure drama film filmed on location in Namibia and Zimbabwe, replacing original director René Manzor after being recommended to producer Kathleen Kennedy by Steven Spielberg. That same year, he directed an episode of the short-lived science fiction series Space Rangers, beginning a career as a television director. In 1998, he directed the Emmy-nominated Aftershock: Earthquake in New York, the first in many television miniseries which Salomon would helm. The most notable of these was Band of Brothers, a 10-part series executive produced by Spielberg for which Salomon won a Primetime Emmy Award for Outstanding Directing for a Limited Series, Movie, or Dramatic Special and a Christopher Award.

Since then, Salomon has over thirty-five programs, including the miniseries adaptations of The Andromeda Strain and Coma broadcast on the A&E Network.

Personal life 
Salomon is of Jewish descent on one parent's side.

Filmography

Television 
TV series

Miniseries

TV movies
 Sole Survivor (2000)
 A Glimpse of Hell (2001)
 Young Arthur (2002)
 Benedict Arnold: A Question of Honor (2003)
 Flirting with Forty (2008)
 Natalee Holloway (2008)
 Who Is Clark Rockefeller? (2010)
 The Lost Future (2010)
 Drew Peterson: Untouchable (2012)
 Blue Lagoon: The Awakening (2012)
 Big Driver (2014)

Film 
Director
 A Far Off Place (1993)
 Hard Rain (1998)
 Freezer (2014) (Direct-to-video)

Cinematographer

Awards and nominations

Won 
 1976 Bodil Special Award for Cinematography
 1986 Robert Award for Best Cinematography: 
 1989 CableACE Award for Direction of Photography and/or Lighting Direction for a Dramatic or Theatrical Special/Movie or Miniseries: The Man Who Broke 1,000 Chains
 2002 Christopher Television & Cable Award: Band of Brothers (with Phil Alden Robinson, Richard Loncraine, David Nutter, Tom Hanks, David Leland, David Frankel. Tony To, Erik Jendresen, John Orloff, E. Max Frye, Graham Yost, Bruce C. McKenna, Erik Bork, Mary Richards, Steven Spielberg, Stephen E. Ambrose, Gary Goetzman)
 2002 Primetime Emmy Award for Outstanding Directing for a Limited Series, Movie, or Dramatic Special: Band of Brothers (with Phil Alden Robinson, Richard Loncraine, David Nutter, Tom Hanks, David Leland, David Frankel, Tony To)

Nominated 
 1990 Academy Award for Best Cinematography: The Abyss
 1990 ASC Award for Outstanding Cinematography in a Theatrical Release: The Abyss
 1992 Academy Award for Best Visual Effects: Backdraft (with Clay Pinney, Allen Hall, Scott Farrar)
 1992 BAFTA Award for Best Visual Effects: Backdraft (with Clay Pinney, Allen Hall, Scott Farrar)
 2008 Primetime Emmy Award for Outstanding Directing for a Limited Series, Movie, or Dramatic Special: The Company
 2008 Primetime Emmy Award for Outstanding Limited Series: The Andromeda Strain
 2008 Directors Guild of America Award for Outstanding Directing in a Movie for Television/Miniseries: The Company
 2009 Directors Guild of America Award for Outstanding Directing in a Movie for Television/Miniseries: The Andromeda Strain
 2011 Directors Guild of America Award for Outstanding Directorial Achievement in Children's Programs: Unnatural History

References

External links 
 

1945 births
Danish cinematographers
Danish film directors
Danish people of Jewish descent
Danish television directors
Living people
People from Copenhagen
Primetime Emmy Award winners
Bodil Honorary Award recipients